The 2012 FC Dallas season is the seventeenth of the team's existence. The team's first game was on March 11 at FC Dallas Stadium. The team failed to make the playoffs for the first time since 2009.

Miscellany

Allocation ranking 
FC Dallas is in the #11 position in the MLS Allocation Ranking. The allocation ranking is the mechanism used to determine which MLS club has first priority to acquire a U.S. National Team player who signs with MLS after playing abroad, or a former MLS player who returns to the league after having gone to a club abroad for a transfer fee. A ranking can be traded, provided that part of the compensation received in return is another club’s ranking.

International roster spots 
FC Dallas has 8 MLS International Roster Slots for use in the 2012 season. Each club in Major League Soccer is allocated 8 international roster spots and there have been no reported trades involving FC Dallas.

Future draft pick trades 
Future picks acquired: * 2013 MLS SuperDraft round 2 pick from Toronto FC.
Future picks traded: * 2013 MLS SuperDraft round 2 pick (Dallas' natural selection) to Philadelphia Union.

MLS

Overall

Regular-season standings 
Western Conference

Major League Soccer results

Major League Soccer

U.S. Open Cup

Match results

Goals

Last updated: 19 August 2012
Source: Match reports in Competitive matches

Jerseys

References

External links

Dallas
FC Dallas seasons
FC Dallas season